The 1976 Baylor Bears football team represented the Baylor University in the 1976 NCAA Division I football season.  The Bears finished the season fourth in the Southwest Conference. Despite finishing the season ranked #19 in the country with a 7–3–1 record, the Bears did not receive an invitation to a bowl game.

Schedule

Personnel

Season summary

Texas

References

Baylor
Baylor Bears football seasons
Baylor Bears football